Menenotus lunatus is a species of leaf-footed bug in the Coreinae subfamily.

Distribution
This species is present in Southern America (Argentina, Brazil, Paraguay) and in Southern Europe (Iberian Peninsula, Portugal).

References

External links
 Barry.fotopage.ru

Insects described in 1832
Spartocerini